Ercan Aydogmus (born 22 August 1979) is a Turkish former professional footballer who played as a striker.

References

External links

Living people
1979 births
Association football forwards
Turkish footballers
VfB Homberg players
SV 19 Straelen players
Bonner SC players
Sportfreunde Lotte players
FC Viktoria Köln players
SC Fortuna Köln players
Wuppertaler SV players
3. Liga players
Regionalliga players